Mordellistena brevicauda is a beetle in the genus Mordellistena of the family Mordellidae. It was described in 1849 by Carl Henrik Boheman.

References

brevicauda
Beetles described in 1849